Dysprosium stannate (Dy2Sn2O7) is an inorganic compound, a ceramic of the stannate family, with pyrochlore structure. 

Dysprosium stannate, like dysprosium titanate and holmium stannate, is a spin ice material. In 2009, quasiparticles resembling magnetic monopoles were observed at low temperature and high magnetic field.

References 

Dysprosium compounds
Stannates